Mawlamyine railway station is a railway station located in Mawlamyine, Mon State, Myanmar on Myanmar Railways' Bago-Mawlamyine-Dawei line.

History
During the British colonial era, the Moulmein railway station was the terminus of isolated Mawlamyine-Ye line on the Tanintharyi coast. The line from Yangon stopped at Mottama (Martaban), and passengers had to take a ferry over the Thanlwin River (Salween River) to Mawlamyine. Only in 2006, with the opening of the Thanlwin Bridge, did a direct link to the rest of the national rail network become possible. A new station, reportedly built to the standards of an "ASEAN railway station", was opened on 17 April 2006.

Service
The station is part of the country's  national rail network. Myanmar Railways, the country's sole railway operator, offers two trains services per day, the first leaving Yangon at 7:00 am and arriving Mawlamyine at 5:00 pm, and the next service leaving Yangon 10:00 am and arriving Mawlamyine at 9:00 pm. For the return journey back to Yangon, the morning service departs Mawlamyine at 6:00 am and arrives Yangon at 5:00 PM and the next train departs Mawlamyine at 8:30 am and arrives Yangon at 8:00 pm.

External links
 Mawlamyine Train Station

References

Mawlamyine
Railway stations in Myanmar